Georgetown is the name of some places in the U.S. state of Wisconsin:
Georgetown, Grant County, Wisconsin, an unincorporated community
Georgetown, Polk County, Wisconsin, a town
Georgetown, Price County, Wisconsin, a town